Carlos Daniel Jurado Román (born 11 June 1947) is a former Uruguayan footballer and manager. He was most recently the manager of Mexican side Estudiantes de Altamira in the Ascenso MX.

Playing career
Carlos Jurado began playing in the Paysandú, the team of the city where he grew up. Later he started in C.A. Peñarol where he played the first level of Uruguay. He went to Club Universitario de Deportes, where he played the first level in Peru. His good performances led him to Europe to play for Real Betis. Just was at Betis and only played one game in La Liga. After a year idle through his compatriot Sergio Rodríguez joined the UD Español San Vicente on third level.

Coaching career
After finishing his playing career, settled in Alicante, Spain. He began training at UD Español San Vicente, then on the Hércules CF youth teams, then to GCD Sant Joan d'Alacant that was a reserve team of Hércules, and in 1983–84 season was given the opportunity to coach the first team. He made some good numbers and Hércules promotion to La Liga. After Hércules CF, began a tour of Spanish and South American teams has led him to train in 6 different countries. In 2011 season he returned to where in the past Cienciano achieved success as the Clausura 2001 or Apertura 2005, or to qualify for the Copa Libertadores in 2002 for the first time in club history. On Cienciano his known as "The Old".

References

External links
 
 

1947 births
Living people
People from Florida Department
Association football defenders
Uruguayan footballers
Uruguay international footballers
Peñarol players
Club Universitario de Deportes footballers
Chilean Primera División players
Expatriate footballers in Peru
Real Betis players
Orihuela Deportiva CF footballers
Expatriate footballers in Spain
La Liga players
Tercera División players
Uruguayan football managers
Uruguayan expatriate football managers
F.C. Motagua managers
Cienciano managers
FBC Melgar managers
Club Xelajú MC managers
Hércules CF managers
La Liga managers
Orihuela Deportiva CF managers
Expatriate football managers in Spain
Expatriate football managers in El Salvador
Expatriate football managers in Honduras
Expatriate football managers in Peru
Peruvian Primera División managers
Expatriate football managers in Guatemala
Expatriate football managers in Mexico
Uruguayan expatriate sportspeople in El Salvador
Uruguayan expatriate sportspeople in Spain
Uruguayan expatriate sportspeople in Mexico
Uruguayan expatriate sportspeople in Honduras
Uruguayan expatriate sportspeople in Guatemala
León de Huánuco managers